Brent Andrew Coull is an American statistician and Professor of Biostatistics at Harvard University.

Biography
He received his Ph.D. in Statistics from the University of Florida in 1997. His thesis advisor was Alan Agresti. He and his advisor came up with the Agresti–Coull interval, an approximate method for calculating binomial confidence intervals.

Honors and awards
He was named a fellow of the American Statistical Association in 2010.

References

American statisticians
Living people
University of Florida alumni
Fellows of the American Statistical Association
Year of birth missing (living people)